V. Anil Kumar (born 1 June 1964) popularly known as Anil Vallathol is a Malayalam language writer and academic from Kerala, India. Anil hails from the family of the poet Vallathol Narayana Menon.

Biography
Anil Vallathol is the son of the Vallathol Shanthakumari and Chandrasekharan Nair. After completing his primary education at Vallathol School, he done his higher studies from Thiroorangady PSMO and Kozhikode Govt Arts and Science College.

After passing master's degree with first rank from the University of Calicut in 1986, he became a Malayalam lecturer at Taliparamba Sir Syed College in 1987 and at Kalady Sanskrit University in 1995. He has been a lecturer at Calicut University since 2006 and became a professor in 2007. Under the guidance of Prof. Chathanath Achuthanunni he done his Ph.D. in Vallathol poems From the University of Calicut. He became the Vice Chancellor of the Malayalam University in 2018.

He has been a member of the Malayalam Language Advisory Committee of the Sahitya Akademi. He is a member of the Board of Studies of various Universities in India. He has published about fifteen books and seventy research papers. During the period from 2012 to 2017, he won a scholarship of 41 lakh in Literary Historiography in Malayalam under the leadership of UGC. Anil Vallathol's books have been included in the graduate syllabus of Calicut and MG Universities. He is associated with progressive movements and is in charge of several cultural institutions.

Family
His wife Sushma is a teacher. His elder son Manjunath is an MBBS graduate and his second son Niranjan is a BSc student.

Literary contributions

Awards and honors
He received the Kerala Kalamandalam Award for Best Documentary, Moorkoth Kumaran Endowment Award, Sreemad Bhagavad Tatwa Sameeksha Award, P.K. Smaraka Trust Award, Pillaras of Secularism Award by MES group, Korot Lakshmikutty Amma Puraskaram and Chanakya Award. His work Ezhuthachan Enna Padapusthakam received the 2019 Abu Dhabi Sakthi Award in scholarly literature category.

References

Malayalam-language writers
Writers from Kerala
Academic staff of the University of Calicut
University of Calicut alumni
1964 births
Living people
Recipients of the Abu Dhabi Sakthi Award